Jean Claudio Montero Berroa (born 3 July 2003) is a Dominican professional basketball player for Real Betis of the Liga ACB. He has previously played for CB Gran Canaria.

Early life and youth career
Born in Santo Domingo, Montero grew up playing basketball and baseball and was introduced to basketball when he visited a court to entertain himself. He first played basketball with his cousin near his home, using the wheels of an old bicycle to make a rim. He started playing the sport seriously at the age of 10 or 11 through Club DOSA in the Villa Juana sector. Montero subsequently moved to Club Mauricio Báez, also based in Villa Juana. He began idolizing Kobe Bryant after watching the 2010 NBA Finals, where Bryant was named Finals Most Valuable Player (MVP). In 2018, Montero began attending DME Academy in Daytona Beach, Florida, where he averaged 20 points and eight rebounds per game. At the time, he also competed for NightRydas Elite at the Nike Elite Youth Basketball League under-15 division.

After having success at the 2019 FIBA Under-16 Americas Championship in June 2019, Montero received offers from clubs in Spain and high schools in the United States. He continued his career with the Spanish club Gran Canaria. Later that month, Montero was named MVP of the Basketball Without Borders Americas camp in Medellín, despite being a year younger than the other participants. In late December 2019, he averaged 21.3 points, 4.8 rebounds, four assists, and 1.8 steals for Gran Canaria's under-18 team at the Valencia Tournament, a qualifier for the Adidas Next Generation Tournament (ANGT). He earned MVP honors of the competition after posting 30 points, six rebounds and seven assists in an 88–72 win over Unicaja's under-18 team in the title game.

Professional career

Gran Canaria (2019–2021)
In the 2019–20 season, Montero began playing for Gran Canaria B, the reserve team of Liga ACB club Gran Canaria, in the third-tier LEB Plata. He immediately became a key player for his team. In his debut on 15 December 2019, Montero recorded 12 points, four assists, and six steals in an 84–65 win over Menorca. One week later, he scored a season-high 28 points in a 97–89 victory over Benicarló. On 18 January 2020, Montero collected 27 points with six three-pointers and six rebounds in a 98–82 win over Pardinyes. He finished the season averaging 15.3 points, 3.4 rebounds, and three assists per game, shooting 43.5 percent from three-point range. 

On 27 September 2020, Montero made his debut for Gran Canaria's senior team in the ACB, recording five points and three rebounds in 10 minutes in an 88–71 loss to Zaragoza. On 5 December, he scored 33 points, a career-high in the LEB Plata, and six rebounds in a 95–86 loss to Navarra. On 17 March 2021, Montero posted 27 points, six rebounds, and six assists in an 82–54 win against Navarra, and was named MVP of Round 21 in the LEB Plata. In the 2020–21 LEB Plata season, he averaged 18 points, 5.7 rebounds, 4.4 assists, and 2.5 steals per game.

Overtime Elite (2021–2022)
On 4 June 2021, Montero was loaned to Team Overtime of Overtime Elite (OTE) for the league's inaugural season. In 24 games, he averaged 16.9 points, 6.1 rebounds, 4.7 assists, and 3.4 steals per game, leading OTE in scoring.

Montero went undrafted in the 2022 NBA draft. He joined the New York Knicks for the 2022 NBA Summer League.

National team career

Junior national team
Shortly before turning 14 years old, Montero made his national team debut for the Dominican Republic at the 2017 FIBA Under-16 Americas Championship in Formosa, Argentina. In five games, he averaged 9.2 points, 3.6 rebounds and 1.8 assists per game, leading his team to fifth place and a spot in the 2018 FIBA Under-17 World Cup in Argentina. At the Under-17 World Cup, Montero was two years younger than most of his opponents but played well against the competition. In seven games, he averaged 15.4 points, 4.9 rebounds and 2.9 assists, while leading the tournament in steals (4.1 per game). He helped the Dominican Republic to ninth place, one of its best finishes in a global tournament.

In December 2018, at the Centrobasket Under-15 Championship in Hermosillo, Montero was named tournament MVP after averaging 25.8 points, eight rebounds and five assists and winning a gold medal. He helped his team win the bronze medal at the 2019 FIBA Under-16 Americas Championship in Belém. Montero led the tournament in points (30.3) and steals (3.3) per game while also averaging 9.5 rebounds and 3.2 assists. In the bronze medal game against Argentina, he recorded 49 points, 12 rebounds and six steals. He was named to the all-tournament team. In July 2018, Montero led the Dominican Republic to fourth place at the Centrobasket Under-17 Championship in San Juan, Puerto Rico. He was the tournament's leading scorer (28.2 points per game) and averaged six rebounds, 4.4 assists, and 4.2 steals.

Senior national team
In August 2019, at age 16, Montero was one of 17 players to join the Dominican Republic senior national team for training camp in preparation for the 2019 FIBA Basketball World Cup in China. He played three exhibition games for the team but did not compete in the World Cup. Montero played for the Dominican Republic during 2022 FIBA AmeriCup qualification.

References

2003 births
Living people
CB Gran Canaria players
Dominican Republic expatriate basketball people in Spain
Dominican Republic men's basketball players
Point guards
Sportspeople from Santo Domingo